Trisha Donnelly (born April 22, 1974 in San Francisco) is a contemporary artist who is particularly well known as a conceptual artist. Donnelly works with various media including photography, drawing, audio, video, sculpture and performance. Donnelly is also a Clinical Associate Professor of Studio Art at New York University. She currently lives and works in San Francisco, California.

Early life
Trisha Donnelly was born on April 22, 1974 in San Francisco, California. In 1995 Donnelly received a bachelor's degree in Fine Arts from the University of California in Los Angeles. In 2000 she attained a Masters in Fine Arts from Yale University.

Career
Donnelly has been on the faculty at New York University's Steinhardt School of Culture, Education, and Human Development since 2008. She is a Clinical Associate Professor of Studio Art.

In 2012, Donnelly was the tenth artist to curate Artist's Choice, an exhibition curated by artists of artworks from the permanent collection of the Museum of Modern Art. In the exhibition, "she was after 'striking voices'" she couldn't let go of, "'paths of encounters and building poetic structures... images that go beyond images themselves."' The exhibition included works by artists such as Eliot Porter, Joe Goode, Gertrude Kasebier, Wendy Carlos, and John Whitney. The audio guide provided for the show was art historian Robert Rosenblum discussing MoMA's 1989 Picasso retrospective. Donnelly explained, "The feeling when listening to these audio guides was, this was a great work of art... or work of whatever, work of another entity, or another state and dimension, existing... [They] are so beautiful... It's like the Taj Mahal of languages, building it himself. By the end, I don't need the exhibition at all. I'm awash in this ocean of his funny, brilliant voice."

Select solo exhibitions
Casey Kaplan gallery, New York, USA (2002)
Air de Paris, Paris, France (2002)
Casey Kaplan gallery, New York, USA (2004)
The Wrong Gallery, New York, USA (2004)
Kölnischer Kunstverein, Cologne, Germany (2005) 
Art Pace, San Antonio, USA (2005)
Kunsthalle Zürich, Zurich, Switzerland (2005)
Trisha Donnelly, Modern Art Oxford, Oxford, UK (2007)
Trisha Donnelly, Institute of Contemporary Art, Philadelphia, USA (2008)
The Renaissance Society, Chicago, USA (2008)
Bologna Museum of Modern Art, Bologna, Italy (2009) 
 Portikus, Frankfurt am Main, Germany (2010)
Casey Kaplan gallery, New York, USA (2010)
Air de Paris, Paris, France (2010)
 Les Rencontres d'Arles, France. Exhibition and Discovery Award laureate (2010)
Galerie Eva Presenhuber, Zurich, Switzerland (2013)
Artist's Choice, Museum of Modern Art, New York, USA (2013)
San Francisco Museum of Modern Art, San Francisco, USA (2013)
Serpentine Galleries (2014)
Matthew Marks Gallery, Los Angeles, USA (2015)
Serralves Museum of Contemporary Art, Porto, Portugal (2016)
2017 Wolfgang Hahn Prize, Museum Ludwig, Cologne (2017)
Galerie Buchholz, Cologne (2018) 
The Shed, NYC (2019)

Select group exhibitions
The World as a Stage (2007)
Venice Biennale (2011 and 2013)
Documenta 13 (2012)
One on One (2012 and 2013) 
Life Itself: On the question of what it essentially is; its materialities, its characteristics…, Moderna Museet, Stockholm, Sweden (2016)
Less Than One, Walker Art Center, Minneapolis, USA (2016)
Galerie Buchholz, Berlin (2017)
In Tune with the World, Fondation Louis Vuitton, Paris, France (2018)
Other Mechanisms, Secession, Vienna, Austria (2018)

Public collections
Donnelly's work can be found in a number of public collections, including:

Museum of Modern Art, New York
Tate
Walker Art Center
Marciano Art Foundation (private collection open to public)
Julia Stoschek Collection (private collection open to public)
Pinault Collection at the Palazzo Grassi (private collection open to public)
Fondation Louis Vuitton

Recognition
In 2017 Donnelly was awarded the Wolfgang Hahn Prize by the Museum Ludwig. Suzanne Cotter, director of Mudam Luxembourg, said of Donnelly in recognition of the award: “Trisha Donnelly is without doubt one of the most compelling artists of our time whose work offers entirely new ways of experiencing and thinking about form, at once synaesthesic and disruptively transporting."

In 2012 Donnelly was awarded the inaugural Faber-Castell International Drawing Award by the Neues Museum.

In 2010 Donnelly was awarded with the LUMA Foundation Photography Prize. In his 2012 Review "The Best of the Basement", critic Jerry Saltz recognized Donnelly as "a rare case of artistic love at first sight".

References

External links
 Trisha Donnelly at NYU

1974 births
Living people
21st-century American women artists
American conceptual artists
Women conceptual artists
UCLA School of the Arts and Architecture alumni
Yale School of Art alumni
San Francisco Art Institute faculty
New York University faculty
Artists from Los Angeles
American women academics